= Jakutophyton =

Jakutophyton Temporal range: Mesoproterozoic

Scientific classification
- Domain: Bacteria
- Phylum: Cyanobacteria
- Genus: †Jakutophyton

Extinct genus of bacteria

Jakutophyton is an extinct genus of stromatolite-making cyanobacteria.
